The Arda is a torrent of Emilia-Romagna, Italy, nearly all of its course being within the  province of Piacenza.  It is a right tributary of the Po River.

The stream then flows through Lugagnano Val d'Arda and Castell'Arquato before entering the plain where it passes through Fiorenzuola d'Arda and Cortemaggiore. Before entering the Po, near Polesine Parmense, it is joined on the right by another torrent, the Ongina, whose source is in the Piacenza hills, between Alseno and Castell'Arquato.

The Arda follows the typical pattern of an Apennine torrent with maximum discharges during the spring and autumn rains and a minimal flow during the summer.

Notes
As of 8 August 2006 the article was based on the corresponding page of the Italian Wikipedia

Rivers of the Province of Piacenza
Rivers of the Province of Parma
Rivers of Italy
Rivers of the Apennines